Sari-Solenzara (formerly in ,) is a commune and municipality in the French department of Corse-du-Sud, on the island of Corsica. It is delineated by several natural borders: the Tyrrhenian Sea to its east, the River Solenzara to its north, and to its west the Aiguilles de Bavella, a beautiful mountain at the heart of the island. A rural district, it essentially consists of two settlements: the larger seaside village of Solenzara, and the smaller hilltop village of Sari. Smaller outlying hamlets include Togna, Canella, Tarcu and Favona. Highly mountainous and forested, Sari-Solenzara falls partially within the Alta Rocca district of the Corsican Regional Nature Reserve.

Population

Sports
Diving
Canyoning
Riding
Fishing harbour and marina
Via ferrata

Local gastronomy
Sausage : lonzu, coppa, wild boar sausage, figatelli
Chestnut paste
 Ewe and goat cheeses

See also
Communes of the Corse-du-Sud department

References

Communes of Corse-du-Sud